Vasaloppet USA is a cross-country skiing event held around Mora in Minnesota, USA. The first race was held in 1973, and the race is held the first Saturday each February. Prior to 2015, the race was held the second Sunday each February.

Even a children's Miniloppet is held, with various lengths for the races so all children, no matter what age, can compete in a shorter race.

The first place male and female racers in the 58 km freestyle race win a trip to compete in the Swedish Vasaloppet, or a thousand dollars prize money (about the equivalent of the trip and entry fee for the Swedish Vasaloppet).

References 

1973 establishments in Minnesota
February sporting events
Recurring sporting events established in 1973
Ski marathons in the United States
Sports competitions in Minnesota